The Rats Are Coming! The Werewolves Are Here! is a 1972 American film written, shot, edited and directed by Andy Milligan.

Plot 
In 1899 lives the eccentric Mooney family who reside in a large house in rural England. The invalid patriarch 'Pa' Mooney is a retired medical doctor who claims to be 180 years old. His eldest daughter, Phoebe, more or less cares for him and is head of the household. His eldest son, Mortimer, is a businessman who conducts the finances and contributes to the income. Younger daughter Monica is a sadist who keeps live rats as pets and frequently mutilates them and other small animals. Youngest son Malcolm is a halfwit with animalistic tendencies; the family keeps him locked in a room with live chickens. The family has a secret: they are all natural born werewolves who transform once a month on the night of the full moon. Pa Mooney has been researching for years to find a way to break the family curse.

Youngest daughter Diana returns home from medical school in Scotland with a new husband, a former classmate named Gerald, of whom Pa heartily disapproves. Pa tells Diana that she is the last hope the family has to overcome the ancient curse, since she is the only member of the family who does not turn into a werewolf on the night of the full moon. Will Diana succeed? Diana is eventually revealed to have other plans, and on top of that, she has her own secret as to why she is "different" from the other werewolves of the Mooney family.

Cast 
Hope Stansbury as Monica Mooney
Jackie Skarvellis as Diana
Noel Collins as Mortimer Mooney
Joan Ogden as Phoebe Mooney
Douglas Phair as Pa Mooney
Ian Innes as Gerald
Berwick Kaler as Malcolm Mooney
Chris Shore
George Clark
Lillian Frit

Release 
The film was released theatrically in the United States by William Mishkin Motion Pictures in 1972. It was filmed entirely in England in 1969 back-to-back with other Milligan directed films, including The Body Beneath, Bloodthirsty Butchers, and The Man with Two Heads. Some scenes were filmed nearly two years later in Staten Island at the request of producer Mishkin to pad out the short running time.

Because of the low budget, Milligan actually acted in at least two different roles during the production under two different names which included playing a gunsmith who sells Diana a pistol containing silver bullets, as well as a pawnshop owner named Mr. Micawber in the re-shot scenes involving Monica and the rats (which were added after Willard achieved popularity).

The film was released on VHS by Midnight Video in the 1980s.

See also
 List of American films of 1972

References

External links

1972 films
American werewolf films
1972 horror films
1970s monster movies
1970s English-language films
Films directed by Andy Milligan
1970s American films